Anatoly Sergeyevich Polyakov (born May 10, 1980) is a butterfly swimmer from Russia, who won a bronze in the men's 200 metres butterfly event at the 2004 European Championships in Madrid, Spain. He represented his native country at two consecutive Summer Olympics, starting in 2000. In 2007 Polyakov was suspended for two years after he failed a drug test for boldenone doping.

References 

 
 

1980 births
Living people
Russian male swimmers
Male butterfly swimmers
Olympic swimmers of Russia
Swimmers at the 2000 Summer Olympics
Swimmers at the 2004 Summer Olympics
Russian male freestyle swimmers
World Aquatics Championships medalists in swimming
Medalists at the FINA World Swimming Championships (25 m)
European Aquatics Championships medalists in swimming
Doping cases in swimming
Sportspeople from the Komi Republic